Iran participated in the 1st West Asian Games held in Tehran, Iran from November 19 to 28, 1997. Iran ranked 1st with 53 gold medals in this edition of the West Asian Games.

Medal table

References

External links
Official website

West Asian Games
Nations at the 1997 West Asian Games
West Asian Games